Evgheni Ivanov (born 21 June 1966) is a retired Moldovan football goalkeeper.

References

1966 births
Living people
Moldovan footballers
FC Zhetysu players
FC Tighina players
FC Samtredia players
CS Tiligul-Tiras Tiraspol players
FC Sheriff Tiraspol players
FC Nistru Otaci players
Association football goalkeepers
Moldova international footballers
FC Lokomotiv Moscow
Moldovan expatriate sportspeople in Russia